Francisco Medrano was a Spanish lyric poet from the sixteenth and seventeenth centuries. He should not be confounded with Sebastian Francisco de Medrano who was also a poet and lived at about the same time.

Life
Medrano was born in Seville 1570. He entered the Society of Jesus and was ordained a priest in 1594. He abandoned the order in 1602 and died in his hometown 1607.

Works
His poetry was influenced by works of Horace and Torquato Tasso. He wrote chiefly sonnets. Medrano's works were published at Palermo (1617) as an appendix to the imitation of Ovid's "Remedia Amoris" by Pedro Venegas de Saavedra, a poet of Seville. According to the Spanish critic Adolfo de Castro, Medrano is the best of the Spanish imitators of Horace, comparing favorably in that respect with Luis de León. Endowed with literary taste, he writes in good Spanish, and his style is free from the gongorism of his time. Among the odes of Medrano, his "La profecia del Tajo" is very similar to one of Luis de León of the same title. Although both are based upon Horace's ode to Mark Antony in which he would separate him and Cleopatra, there is a great difference between them. Léon's ode departs from the original of Horace, while Medrano's is an imitation of the latter so close as to amount almost to a translation. The poems of Medrano are reprinted in La biblioteca de autores españoles.

Translations
Two sonnets by Francisco de Medrano were translated into English by Henry Wadsworth Longfellow. They are Art and Nature and The Two Harvests.

References

Attribution
 The entry cites:
Biblioteca de autores españoles, vols. XXXII, XXXV, and XLII (Madrid, 1848–86).

Bibliography 
 Manuel Mañas Núñez, Horacio (Oda 2, 16) en Francisco de Medrano (Oda XXIV) (in Spanish).

External links 
 Francisco de Medrano's works at Spanish Wikisource.
 Francisco de Medrano, Sonetos. Editados por Ramón García González.
 Srancisco de Medrano's sonnets at Golden Age Sonnets.

Spanish poets
17th-century deaths
1570 births
1607 deaths
Spanish male poets